The men's 50 metre freestyle competition of the 2008 FINA World Swimming Championships (25 m) was held on 10 and 11 April 2008 at the Manchester Arena.

The event was won by the defending champion Croatian Duje Draganja in a new world record time of 20.81 seconds, breaking the previous mark set by Sweden's Stefan Nystrand six months earlier by 0.12 seconds. Swimming in lane 1 in the final, Draganja also broke the championship record of 21.31 set by Cullen Jones of the United States in Shanghai in 2006.

Great Britain's Mark Foster won the silver medal, finishing a half a second behind Draganja while Gerhard Zandberg of South Africa finished third in 21.33.

Records
Prior to the competition, the existing world and championship records were as follows.

Results

Heats

Semifinals
The semifinals were held at 19:53.

Finals
The final was held at 20:50.

References

Freestyle 0050 metre, men's
World Short Course Swimming Championships
FINA World Swimming Championships (25 m)